Terellia quadratula is a species of tephritid or fruit flies in the genus Terellia of the family Tephritidae.

Distribution
Israel, Lebanon, Caucasus, Iran.

References

Tephritinae
Insects described in 1869
Diptera of Asia